Garcete is a surname. Notable people with the surname include:

Gabriel Garcete (born 1982), Paraguayan footballer
Laura Garcete (born 1990), Paraguayan model and beauty pageant titleholder
Oscar Páez Garcete (1937–2016), Paraguayan Roman Catholic bishop
Tranquilino Garcete (1907–?), Paraguayan footballer